Bobar Radio - Studio B2 or Bobar B2 is a Bosnian local commercial radio station, broadcasting from Bijeljina, Bosnia and Herzegovina. This radio station broadcasts a variety of programs such music and local news.

The owner of the local radio station is the company BOBAR RADIO d.o.o Bijeljina which also operates a national commercial radio station Bobar Radio.

The program is mainly produced in Serbian at one FM frequency (Bijeljina ) and it is available in the city of Bijeljina as well as in nearby municipalities in Semberija area.

Estimated number of listeners of Bobar Radio - Studio B2 is around 65.611.

Frequencies
 Bijeljina

See also 
 List of radio stations in Bosnia and Herzegovina
 BN Radio
 Bobar Radio
 RSG Radio

References

External links 
 www.radiobobar.com
 www.radiostanica.ba
 www.fmscan.org
 Communications Regulatory Agency of Bosnia and Herzegovina

Bijeljina
Radio stations established in 2011
Bijeljina
Mass media in Bijeljina